Reinhold Viktor Pommer (6 January 1935 – 26 March 2014) was a road and track cyclist from Germany, who won the bronze medal in the men's team road race at the 1956 Summer Olympics in Melbourne, Australia, along with Horst Tüller and Gustav-Adolf Schur.

References

External links
 
 

1935 births
2014 deaths
German male cyclists
Olympic bronze medalists for the United Team of Germany
Cyclists at the 1956 Summer Olympics
Olympic cyclists of the United Team of Germany
Olympic medalists in cycling
People from Haßfurt
Sportspeople from Lower Franconia
Cyclists from Bavaria
Medalists at the 1956 Summer Olympics
Sportspeople from the Olomouc Region
20th-century German people